Michael Thomas Halifax Wyatt (26 April 1829 – 5 March 1909) was an English first-class cricketer.

Born at North Wraxall in Wiltshire, Wyatt studied at Exeter College, Oxford. A member of the Oxford University Cricket Club, Wyatt made his debut in first-class cricket for the university in 1850 against the Marylebone Cricket Club (MCC) at Oxford. He made three further first-class appearances for the university, the last coming in 1851 against Cambridge University at Lord's. He made two further appearances in first-class cricket for the MCC against Cambridge University and Oxford University in 1858. Playing a total of six first-class matches, he scored 78 runs at an average of 9.75, with a highest score of 17 not out. He died at Westminster in March 1909.

References

External links

1829 births
1909 deaths
People from Wiltshire
Alumni of Exeter College, Oxford
English cricketers
Oxford University cricketers
Marylebone Cricket Club cricketers